The People's Congress System is officially the legislative system of China. 

The People's Congress System was set out in the Electoral Law of 1953 and have been subsequently revised. Currently there are five levels of people's congresses. From more to less local, they are: (1) people's congresses in villages, minority nationality townships, and towns; (2) people's congresses of cities that are not sub-divided, municipal districts, counties, and autonomous counties; (3) people's congresses in sub-districts of larger cities and in autonomous prefectures; (4) people's congresses in provinces, autonomous regions, and municipalities directly administered by China's central government; and (5) the National People's Congress. Direct elections occur at the two most local levels, while the members at the higher levels are indirectly elected, i.e., elected by those elected in the lower levels. The National People's Congress is officially China's highest organ of state power, with the Standing Committee being its permanent body. However, nominations at all levels are controlled by the CCP, and CCP's leading position is enshrined in the state constitution, meaning that the elections have little way of influencing politics. Additionally, elections are not pluralistic as no opposition is allowed.

References 

Chinese law
Constitution of China